Princess Maria may refer to:

 Princess Laetitia Maria of Belgium, Archduchess of Austria-Este (born 2003)
 Princess Maria Antonia of Naples and Sicily (1784–1806), Princess of Asturias
 Princess Maria Beatrice of Savoy (born 1943), youngest daughter of Italy's last king and his queen
 Princess Maria Clotilde of Savoy (1843–1911), Italian princess
 Princess Maria Francesca of Savoy (1914–2000), Italian princess
 Princess Maria Gabriella of Savoy (born 1940), daughter of Umberto II
 Princess Maria of Greece and Denmark (1876–1940), 5th child of George I of Greece and Olga Konstantinovna of Russia
 Princess Maria Josepha of Saxony (1867–1944), mother of Emperor Karl I of Austria
 Princess Maria Laura of Belgium, Archduchess of Austria-Este (born 1988)
 Princess Maria Louise, a character in the fictional anime Mobile Fighter G Gundam
 Princess Maria Manuela of Asturias (1527–1545), Portuguese princess
 Princess Maria of Romania (born 1964), youngest daughter and fifth child of Michael I and Queen Anne
 Princess Maria of Romania (1870-1874), only child of Carol I of Romania and Elisabeth of Wied
 Princess Maria Pia of Bourbon-Parma (born 1934), oldest daughter of Umberto II of Italy and Marie-José of Belgium
 Princess Maria Tatiana of Yugoslavia (born 1957), first child of Prince Andrej of Yugoslavia and Princess Christina of Hesse-Kassel
 Princess Maria Teresa of Bourbon-Two Sicilies (1867–1909), child of Lodovico, Count of Trani and Mathilde Ludovika

See also
 Princess Maria-Esmeralda
 Princess Marie (disambiguation)
 Princess Mary (disambiguation)
 Queen Mary (disambiguation)